KHLK is a Christian radio formatted broadcast radio station licensed to Brownfield, Texas, serving Lubbock, Texas.  KHLK is owned and operated by Houston Christian Broadcasters, Inc.

History
On March 1, 2019 Barton Broadcasting sold Tejano music KEJS-FM POWER 104.3 to Houston Christian Broadcasters, Inc. obtain and acquired the FM station for $225,000, which operates as its primary station KHCB-FM in Houston and change its call sign to KHLK and format to Christian radio.

References

External links
 KHCB Radio Network 104.3 Online
 

HLK
1984 establishments in Texas
HLK
Radio stations established in 1984